Kochevaya is a rural locality (a settlement) in "Gorod Akthubinsk" of Akhtubinsky District, Astrakhan Oblast, Russia. The population was 13 as of 2010.

Geography 
It is located 244 km from Astrakhan, 19 km from Akhtubinsk.

References 

Rural localities in Akhtubinsky District